The 2018 College Basketball Invitational (CBI) was a single-elimination men's college basketball tournament consisting of 16 National Collegiate Athletic Association (NCAA) Division I teams that did not participate in the 2018 NCAA Men's Division I Basketball Tournament or the NIT. It was held from March 13 through March 30, 2018 in various arenas. This marked the 11th year the Tournament had been held.

North Texas defeated San Francisco two games to one in the best-of-three championship series to win the CBI championship.

Participating teams
The following teams were announced as participants Sunday, March 11 after the NCAA Selection Show.

Declined invitations 
The following programs received an invitation to the CBI, but declined to participate:

 Bradley
 Georgetown
 Maryland
 Northeastern
 Oakland
 SMU
 Toledo
 Tulsa
 VCU

Format
The 2018 CBI had 16 teams organized into four regional brackets of four teams. The four teams that advanced to the semifinals were reseeded. The finals were a best-of-three series.

The participants were announced Sunday, March 12 after the NCAA Selection Show.

Schedule
Source:

Bracket

Home teams listed first.
* Denotes overtime period.

References

External links
 College Basketball Invitational official website

College Basketball Invitational
College Basketball Invitational